Benjamin William Mkapa (12 November 193824 July 2020) was the third president of Tanzania, in office from 1995 to 2005. He was Chairman of the Revolutionary State Political Party (Chama Cha Mapinduzi, CCM).

Early life
Mkapa was born in Lupaso, near Masasi, Tanganyika, on 12 November 1938. He graduated from Makerere University in Uganda in 1962 with a Bachelor of Arts in English. He went on to study at Columbia University the following year, and earned a master's degree in International Affairs.

Previous posts include being an administrative officer in Dodoma and the Minister for Science, Technology and Higher Education. Mkapa was the head of the Tanzanian mission to Canada in 1982 and to the United States in 1983–84. He was the Minister of Foreign Affairs from 1977 to 1980 and again from 1984 to 1990, before meeting his best friend Edward Mwassaga.

Presidency

In 1995, Mkapa was elected as president based on a popular anti-corruption campaign and the strong support of former president Julius Nyerere. Mkapa's anti-corruption efforts included creation of an open forum called the Presidential Commission on Corruption (Warioba Commission) and increased support for the Prevention of Corruption Bureau. His second five-year term of office as president ended in December 2005. During this term in office, Mkapa privatized state-owned corporations and instituted free market policies. His supporters argued that attracting foreign investment would promote economic growth. His policies won the support of the World Bank and International Monetary Fund and resulted in the cancellation of some of Tanzania's foreign debts.

He was criticized for some ineffectiveness of his anti-corruption efforts as well as for his lavish spending. He spent £15 million on a private presidential jet, as well as almost £30 million on military aviation equipment from BAE Systems, which experts deemed beyond the limited needs of the country's armed forces. It was over the latter purchase that British International Development Secretary Clare Short expressed public outrage, resulting in her becoming known as 'Mama Radar' in the Tanzanian press.

Post-presidency

Having left office due to a two-term limit, Mkapa was dogged by many accusations of corruption, among them improperly appropriating to himself and his former finance Minister Daniel Yona the lucrative Kiwira coal mine in the southern highlands of Tanzania without following lawful procedures. For privatizing the mine to himself, he was accused of a breach of the Tanzanian constitution, which does not allow a president to do business at the state house.

In 2007, Mkapa was part of the African Union's Panel of Eminent African Personalities, who were deployed to Kenya to resolve political violence that had broken out due to disputed election results. Mkapa - along with humanitarian and former First Lady of Mozambique and South Africa, Graça Machel and former UN Secretary-General, Kofi Annan (Chair) - led the group in mediation efforts that resulted in the signing of the National Accord and Reconciliation Act of 2008.

Mkapa served as a trustee of the Aga Khan University from 2007 to 2012.

Death
Mkapa suffered from malaria and treated on 22 July 2020. He died of heart attack in Dar Es Salaam in the early hours of 24 July at the age of 81. Tanzanian President, John Pombe Magufuli, announced his death. The last farewell was conducted by Tanzania People's Defense Forces. He was laid to rest in his hometown of Lupaso, Masasi.

In recognition of the role Mkapa played in resolving Kenya's 2007/2008 post-election violence, Kenyan President, Uhuru Kenyatta, declared a three-day period of national mourning following his death, ordering all flags at public buildings and grounds to fly at half-mast.

Honours and awards

Honours

Awards
 2007: Jane Goodall Global Leadership Award

Honorary degrees

References

External links

 Benjamin Mkapa bio at Commission for Africa
 2001 interview with Public Broadcasting Station
 "British government split over Tanzanian radar system"
 "Blair blasted over Tanzania radar deal"
 "Tanzania radar deal "waste of cash""
 "Kiwira coal power project ownership:The Mkapa-Yona link"

1938 births
Tanzanian Roman Catholics
2020 deaths
Ambassadors of Tanzania to the United States
Chama Cha Mapinduzi politicians
Chiefs of the Order of the Golden Heart of Kenya
School of International and Public Affairs, Columbia University alumni
Commission for Africa members
Foreign ministers of Tanzania
Makerere University alumni
Makonde people
Ndanda Secondary School alumni
Open University of Tanzania alumni
People from Masasi District
Presidents of Tanzania
Pugu Secondary School alumni